Bradynema rigidum is a parasitic species of nematode in the Allantonematidae family. The species has been classified as androdioecious. The parasite will live freely in its host; groupings of 2–3 to up to twenty may occur together.

In this species it was found that blastomeres in the 4 cell stage might be in 2 possible arrangements.

The species was originally discovered by Philipp Franz von Siebold in the 19th century. Otto zur Strassen received a doctorate in 1892 for writing his dissertation about the nematode.
The larva development was first described by Wülker. In this species male larva develop into adults after 8 days, while the females develop into adults after 7 or 10 days. All adults are hermaphrodites. It has been suggested that males develop ovaries and become hermaphrodites while the females degenerate.

References 

Tylenchida
Nematodes